Nairaland is a Nigerian English-language internet forum. Founded by Nigerian entrepreneur Seun Osewa on March 8, 2005, it is targeted primarily at Nigerian domestic residents and is the 6th most visited website in Nigeria.

It currently has over 2.64 million registered users with over 6.19 million topics created to date, and it is estimated that approximately 3% of Nigerian Internet users are registered on Nairaland, compared to Facebook's 11 million Nigerian users, which corresponds to approximately 20% of the local Internet population. Registration is only necessary for posting, commenting or liking posts.

Incidents

2014 4chan prank
During the Ebola virus epidemic, users from 4chan registered on Nairaland in 2014 to propagate false claims that Americans and Europeans were spreading the Ebola virus in magical rituals through worship of 4chan's "Ebola-chan" meme (an anime personification of the Ebola virus).

2014 down period
On June 22, 2014, following a successful hacking attempt, Nairaland went offline briefly. The hackers were able to gain access to, and wipe the contents of, the website's host server and backup. Three days later, it was back online after some data had been recovered from a remote backup. However, user posts and registration between January 10, 2014, and June 22, 2014, was lost. Users with lost accounts were required to re-register.

QAnon conspiracy theory
In August 2020, The Daily Beast reported that some users on Nairaland were promoting the QAnon conspiracy theory.

Notes

References

Internet properties established in 2005
Nigerian social networking websites
Internet forums